Carvin Nkanata (born 6 May 1991) is an American-born Kenyan athlete specialising in the sprinting events. He won the bronze medal in the 200 metres at the 2014 African Championships. His personal best in the 200 metres (20.14, set in 2015) is the current Kenyan record.

Competition record

References

External links

 
 
 
 
 
 

1991 births
Living people
Kenyan male sprinters
American people of Kenyan descent
People from Summerville, South Carolina
Olympic athletes of Kenya
Athletes (track and field) at the 2016 Summer Olympics
Commonwealth Games competitors for Kenya
Athletes (track and field) at the 2014 Commonwealth Games
World Athletics Championships athletes for Kenya